Dave Rennie (born 22 November 1963) is a New Zealand and Cook Islands professional rugby union coach and former player who was the head coach of the Australia national rugby union team from 2020 to 2023, having previously coached New Zealand sides the Chiefs, the New Zealand U20, as well as Glasgow Warriors in Scotland. Rennie's playing position was Centre. In November 2019 he was named the head coach of the Australian national team until being sacked in January 2023.

Rugby union playing career

Amateur and provincial

Rennie played with Upper Hutt RFC in Wellington, New Zealand. He finished playing early at 27 due to a recurring shoulder injury.

Rennie played with the Wellington Lions. He won the NPC title with the Lions in 1986. Later as head coach he guided the team to their next NPC title 14 years later in 2000.

International 

Rennie's mother was from Rarotonga in the Cook Islands, and thus Rennie was eligible for the Cook Islands national rugby union team.
He played for the Cook Islands national rugby union team for one game in 1990, but it was a non-capped match.

Rugby union coaching career

Early coaching career

After playing for the amateur side Rennie then coached Upper Hutt RFC.

Wellington Lions

He became the assistant coach of the Wellington Lions in 1999 before becoming head coach in 2000. In his first year as the head coach, he led the Wellington Lions to their first NPC title since 1986. He stayed with the Lions until 2002.

Hurricanes

Rennie became first the Hurricanes Under 23 head coach and then the assistant coach of the Hurricanes.

Rennie also coached at the New Zealand international academy.

Manawatu

Originally a short-term contract, Rennie was the coach of the  Turbos in the ITM Cup from 2005 to 2011. Under Rennie the Turbos were Championship Runner-up in the 2011 ITM Cup.

New Zealand U20

Rennie was coach of the New Zealand national under-20 rugby union team and the team won three consecutive World titles from 2008 to 2010.

Chiefs

He joined the Chiefs for the 2012 season and led them to their first ever Super Rugby title. In doing so Rennie became the first first-year Super Rugby coach to win a Super Rugby title

The day of the final itself proved highly eventful. As Rennie guided the Chiefs to a 37–6 win over the Sharks, his house was robbed and valuables were stolen. A similar opportunist theft had occurred to Chiefs player Sonny Bill Williams several weeks earlier.

He coached the Chiefs to their second straight Super Rugby title in the 2013 season, beating the Brumbies.  Rennie's "rookie" streak was only superseded by Scott Robertson in 2019, who won six successive titles in his first three seasons as head coach of the Crusaders from 2017, winning in his rookie year, then again in 2018 - 2022.

Rennie's coaching record at the Chiefs was:

 2012: 16 matches in round robin for 12 wins, 4 losses and points scored were 444 for & 358 against. The Chiefs won the semi final versus the Crusaders 20–17 and the final against the Sharks 37–6.
 2013: 16–12–0–4, points 458–364. Wins in semi final versus the Crusaders 20–19 and final against the Brumbies 27–22.
 2014: 16–8–2–6, points 384–378. Placed 2nd in New Zealand conference and 5th overall. Lost quarter final 30–32 versus the Brumbies at Canberra.
 2015: 16–10–0–6, points 372–299. Placed 5th. Lost quarter final against the Highlanders.
 2016: 15–11–0–4, points 491–341. Placed 6th. Won quarter final 60–21 versus the Stormers but lost the semifinal against the Hurricanes 9–25.
 2017: 15–12–1–2, points 433–293. Placed 5th. Won quarter final versus the Sharks 17–11 but lost the semi final 13–27 against the Crusaders.

Glasgow Warriors

On 19 August 2016, Glasgow Warriors announced that Rennie would replace Gregor Townsend as head coach for the 2017–18 season. Under Townsend, Warriors were a top Pro12 side; they reached the play-offs in every year of his charge – except his last; where he guided the Warriors to their first European Champions Cup Quarter-Final. Townsend won the Pro12 title with Glasgow Warriors in 2015.

In Rennie's first season, Glasgow Warriors made the Pro14 semi-finals, but the side was beaten at Scotstoun Stadium by the Scarlets. In the European Champions Cup they finished bottom of their pool.

For the 2018–19 season, Glasgow Warriors reached the Pro14 final at Celtic Park in Glasgow. A large home-based Warriors support gave the Pro14 its biggest ever attendance for a final. Despite this Leinster capitalised on a Stuart Hogg error and ground out the match to win the title. In the European Champions Cup, Glasgow Warriors qualified out of the pool stages to meet Saracens in the Quarter final. Having run Saracens very close at home; and matched them until the final quarter of the away pool match – Scottish hopes were raised for the Quarter Final in London. However Saracens saved their best performance for that match and then went on to win the European title.

After a coronavirus curtailed season in the 2019–20 season, Glasgow Warriors were in the 3rd place of their conference; which would have normally secured a place in the play-off finals to determine the Pro14 champion. Danny Wilson took over the head coach role on 1 June 2020. On leaving Rennie said: “It’s been good for me. I was keen to experience a different culture and a different type of footie. Rugby goes forever up here, the seasons roll into one, so you have to be very detailed around your planning. Around the international commitments you lose players for big chunks of time so you have to bring through young kids and manage a much bigger squad." Of Glasgow Warriors and Scotland he concluded: ""But it's the people I'll miss. A lot of it comes back to laughter. The Scottish are funny people and I haven't laughed as much in any environment as much as I have in my time here. I've travelled all over Scotland and had a decent look at various things. My grandfather was born in Stranraer so we spent a bit of time down there. We went up to Skye and went to Oban and went to this seafood restaurant right on the water and it was as good as any seafood I've ever tasted. I've loved the food, I've loved the people and I've loved our time here. It's been special, we'll miss it."

Wallabies
On 20 November 2019, Rugby Australia announced that Rennie would replace Michael Cheika as head coach of the Wallabies.

On 12th November 2022, Under pressure coach Dave Rennie defended making mass changes to his team after the Wallabies were stunned in a historic first loss (28-27) to Italy in Florence.

On 16th January 2023, Rugby Australia announced that Rennie would be replaced by Eddie Jones

Coaching approach
Rennie has been described as "hard-nosed, doesn't tolerate fools, is astute and has a deep rugby intelligence."

Statistics

International matches as head coach
Note: World Rankings Column shows the World Ranking Australia was placed at on the following Monday after each of their matches

Record by country

Honours 
The Rugby Championship
 Runner-up: 2021
 Nelson Mandela Challenge Plate
 Winner: 2021, 2022
 Puma Trophy
 Winner: 2020, 2021, 2022
 Trophée des Bicentenaires
 Winner: 2021
 Hopetoun Cup
 Winner: 2022
 James Bevan Trophy
 Winner: 2022

Outside rugby

Rennie was a school teacher in Upper Hutt. He taught to 12 and 13 year olds: 'intermediate', between primary and secondary education.
In comparing his former job of teaching with coaching rugby union, Rennie said: "Teaching, coaching, it's the same thing. The kids are just a bit bigger."

While coaching Upper Hutt RFC at amateur level, Rennie owned and ran a pub called the Lonely Goat Herd in Upper Hutt, Wellington.

Rennie plays guitar and also enjoys landscape gardening.

References

External links
Dave Rennie Profile
International Rugby  Academy Profile

1963 births
New Zealand rugby union players
New Zealand rugby union coaches
New Zealand sportspeople of Cook Island descent
Wellington rugby union players
Sportspeople from Upper Hutt
Living people
People educated at Heretaunga College
Cook Islands international rugby union players
Cook Island rugby union players
Glasgow Warriors coaches